Peter Škantár (born 20 July 1982) is a retired Slovak slalom canoeist who competed at the international level from 1998 to 2018, along with his cousin Ladislav Škantár in the C2 class. They retired from canoe slalom in 2018 after the C2 event was discontinued and subsequently switched to wildwater canoeing. They announced retirement from wildwater canoeing during the 2021 World Championships in their hometown Bratislava where they didn't start due to Ladislav's injury.

Career
He won an Olympic gold medal in 2016 in Rio de Janeiro in the C2 event. He also won ten medals at the ICF Canoe Slalom World Championships with a gold (C2 team: 2009), five silvers (C2: 2009, 2017; C2 team: 2011, 2013, 2014) and four bronzes (C2: 2011, 2013, 2014; C2 team: 2007). He won the overall World Cup title in the C2 category in 2009, 2010 and 2014. At the European Championships Škantár won a total of 13 medals (7 golds, 1 silver and 5 bronzes).

As of 2021 he is the coach of Matej Beňuš.

World Cup individual podiums

1 European Championship counting for World Cup points
2 Oceania Canoe Slalom Open counting for World Cup points

References

12 September 2009 final results for the men's C2 team slalom event for the 2009 ICF Canoe Slalom World Championships. – accessed 12 September 2009.
13 September 2009 final results of the men's C2 event at the 2009 ICF Canoe Slalom World Championships. – accessed 13 September 2009.

External links
 
 
 
 

Living people
Slovak male canoeists
1982 births
Canoeists at the 2016 Summer Olympics
Olympic canoeists of Slovakia
Olympic gold medalists for Slovakia
Olympic medalists in canoeing
Medalists at the 2016 Summer Olympics
People from Kežmarok
Sportspeople from the Prešov Region
Medalists at the ICF Canoe Slalom World Championships